Lo Ok-sil (born 15 April 1966) is a North Korean gymnast. She competed in six events at the 1980 Summer Olympics.

References

1966 births
Living people
North Korean female artistic gymnasts
Olympic gymnasts of North Korea
Gymnasts at the 1980 Summer Olympics
Place of birth missing (living people)
20th-century North Korean women